Clare Boylan (21 April 1948 – 16 May 2006) was an Irish author, journalist and critic for newspapers, magazines and many international broadcast media.

Life and career
Born in Dublin in 1948, to Patrick and Evelyn Boylan (née Selby). Boylan began her career as a journalist at the now defunct Irish Press. In 1974 she won the Journalist of the Year award when working in the city for the Evening Press. There she met her husband, fellow journalist Alan Wilkes. From 1981, she edited the glossy magazine Image, before largely giving up journalism to focus on a career as an author in 1984.

Her novels are Holy Pictures (1983), Last Resorts (1984), Black Baby (1988), Home Rule (1992), Beloved Stranger (1999), Room for a Single Lady (1997) - which won the Spirit of Light Award and was optioned for a film - and Emma Brown (2003). The latter work is a continuation of a 20-page fragment written by Charlotte Brontë before her death.

Boylan's short stories are collected in A Nail on the Head (1983), Concerning Virgins (1990) and That Bad Woman (1995). The film Making Waves, based on her short story "Some Ladies on a Tour", was nominated for an Oscar in 1988.

Her non-fiction includes The Agony and the Ego (1994) and The Literary Companion to Cats (1994). She wrote introductions to the novels of Kate O'Brien and Molly Keane and adapted Molly Keane's novel Good Behaviour as the classic serial for BBC Radio 4 (2004). Boylan's work has been translated as far afield as Russia and Hong Kong.

Many of her writings were inspired by feminist thinking. She said of this theme that “by definition I am a woman writer because the things that interest me are the things that are most interesting to women”. Her works gained her membership to Aosdána.

In later life, she lived in County Wicklow with her husband Alan Wilkes. She died after a lengthy struggle with ovarian cancer, aged 58.

References

External links 

 Boylan's Estate
 Boylan on WorldCat

1948 births
2006 deaths
Aosdána members
Deaths from cancer in the Republic of Ireland
Deaths from ovarian cancer
Evening Press people
Irish magazine editors
Irish women editors
Irish non-fiction writers
Irish women non-fiction writers
Irish women novelists
Irish women short story writers
Irish women journalists
Journalists from Dublin (city)
The Irish Press people
21st-century Irish non-fiction writers
20th-century Irish women writers
21st-century Irish women writers
20th-century Irish novelists
20th-century Irish short story writers
21st-century Irish short story writers
Women magazine editors
20th-century Irish non-fiction writers